This is the list of individual trees located in Estonia. These individual trees located in Estonia are notable because of their natural (e.g. the highest, the thickest, the oldest), historical or mythological context.

See also
 List of individual trees

References 

Trees